Clubiona alpicola is a sac spider species found from Europe to Central Asia.

See also 
 List of Clubionidae species

References

External links 

Clubionidae
Spiders of Asia
Spiders of Europe
Spiders described in 1882